Waldemar Kophamel (August 16, 1880 – November 4, 1934) was a highly decorated German U-boat commanding officer in the Imperial German Navy during World War I.

Kophamel joined the Imperial German Navy on 12 April 1898 and started his military education on a ship named . At the start of the First World War Kophamel was a Kapitänleutnant and commanded . In October 1915 he was promoted to Korvettenkapitän and in December of that year took command of the  Pola Flotilla. In July 1917 he returned to sea, in command of U-151 and later . He damaged four ships totaling 8,701 GRT, and two warships including .

One of his notable actions was sinking the US lightship LV-71 off the coast of the United States. The crew, as well as survivors from another of his victims, USS Merak, a freighter seized by the US and assigned to the Naval Overseas Transportation Service, escaped the lightship and rowed to shore.

From April 1919 until June 1920, he commanded the light cruiser .  Kophamel was promoted to Fregattenkapitän on 31 August 1920, the day he left the service.  He died in 1934.

The submarine tender Waldemar Kophamel was named in his honor in 1939 and served in the German Navy until sunk by the Royal Air Force on 18 December 1944.  After the war, it was raised by the USSR, renamed Kuban, and served with the Soviet Navy until 1978.

Awards and decorations
 Order of the Red Eagle, 4th class (Prussia)
 Lifesaving Medal (Prussia)
 Iron Cross (1914), 1st and 2nd class
 Knight's Cross of the Royal House Order of Hohenzollern with Swords
 Pour le Mérite
 Hanseatic Cross of Hamburg
 Military Merit Cross, 1st class (Mecklenburg-Schwerin)

References

1880 births
1934 deaths
People from Grudziądz
People from West Prussia
U-boat commanders (Imperial German Navy)
Imperial German Navy personnel of World War I
Recipients of the Pour le Mérite (military class)
Recipients of the Military Merit Cross (Mecklenburg-Schwerin), 1st class